The Enchanted Cottage is a 1924 American silent drama film directed by John S. Robertson based upon a 1923 play by Arthur Wing Pinero.

The film was produced by Richard Barthelmess, through his company Inspiration, and released through Associated First National. Barthelmess and May McAvoy star in the drama.

Robert Young and Dorothy McGuire starred in a 1945 version also based on the 1923 play.

Plot
As described in a film magazine review, Oliver Bashforth (Barthelmess), physically wrecked by the late war and hating himself because of his twisted body and hollow cheeks, breaks his engagement with his boyhood sweetheart and quits his family to seek isolation in a lonely cottage in the woods. There he meets Laura Pennington (McAvoy), a lonely little governess, whose plainness makes her unattractive to men. They marry and then both commit themselves to intense depression because they are both so ugly. However, with the dawning of real love, both commence to see each other through the beauty of the soul, with the consequence that each appears as handsome to each other as either could wish. In the week of their enchantment, they have found love and they look forward to a future happiness and to the creation of children who will embody the beauty they do not possess.

Reception
A reviewer for Photoplay wrote, "To anyone with a poetic soul, this picture will be a rare treat. But the too literal person will be sadly disappointed. A picture for folk who dare to dream. As such we cannot recommend it too highly."

"There is a charm about the spoken or written word that is frequently too elusive to be caught by the camera, and in its efforts to make things clear, too often the screen makes them merely clumsy," wrote Marguerite Orndorff for The Educational Screen. "There was a danger of such a result in filming this whimsy of Pinero's, but the direction of John S. Robertson, and the understanding portrayals of May McAvoy and Richard Barthelmess have in a large measure preserved its delicacy."

Cast

Preservation
A print of The Enchanted Cottage is preserved at the Library of Congress in Washington DC.

References

External links

1924 films
1920s fantasy drama films
American silent feature films
Films directed by John S. Robertson
American black-and-white films
American films based on plays
Films set in England
American fantasy drama films
First National Pictures films
1924 drama films
1920s English-language films
1920s American films
Silent American drama films